Kenneth X. Robbins is a psychiatrist, collector of south Asian art, and author known for his studies of expatriate communities in Asia. In 1990, Robbins donated a collection of materials relating to India to the Smithsonian Institution. He received his B.A. from Columbia University in 1963 and M.D. from the New York University School of Medicine.

Selected publications
"The Sculpture of India, 3000 B.C.-1300 A.D." in Arts of Asia, 15:5, pp. 100–9. (1985)
Maharajas, nawabs & other princes beyond number- from the Robbins Collection of the Indian princely states: Exhibition guide. Golden Lotus Press, 1991.
African Elites in India: Habshi Amarat. Mapin Publishing, 2006.  (Editor with John McLeod)
Western Jews in India: From the Fifteenth Century to the Present. Manohar Publishers, 2013.  (Editor with Marvin Tokayer)
Jews and the Indian National Art Project. Niyogi Books, 2015.  (Editor with Marvin Tokayer)

References

External links
Kenneth X. Robbins discussing African Elites in India at the Library of Congress.

Living people
American psychiatrists
American non-fiction writers
Year of birth missing (living people)
American art collectors
American philatelists

Columbia College (New York) alumni
New York University Grossman School of Medicine alumni